Dylan Taylor may refer to:

 Dylan Taylor (actor) (born 1981), Canadian actor
 Dylan Taylor (executive) (born 1970), American business executive and philanthropist
 Dylan Taylor (bassist) (born 1960), American bassist